Dizicheh (also Romanized as Dīzīcheh; also known as Dīzān and Dīzī) is a city in the Central District of Mobarakeh County, Isfahan Province, Iran.  At the 2006 census, its population was 17,966, in 4,759 families.

References

Populated places in Mobarakeh County

Cities in Isfahan Province